NGC 6039 is a massive lenticular galaxy located about 460 million light-years away in the constellation Hercules. NGC 6039 was discovered by astronomer Édouard Stephan on June 27, 1870 and later rediscovered by astronomer Lewis Swift on June 27, 1886. NGC 6039 is member of the Hercules Cluster, which is part of the CfA2 Great Wall.

See also
 List of NGC objects (6001–7000)
 NGC 1316

References

External links

Hercules (constellation)
Lenticular galaxies
6039
56972
Astronomical objects discovered in 1870
Hercules Cluster
Discoveries by Édouard Stephan